Alfred W. Morrison House, also known as Lilac Hill, is a historic home located near Fayette, Howard County, Missouri.  Built about 1830 as the main residence of a forced-labor farm, it is a -story, Federal-style brick dwelling with flanking -story wings.

The house was built by people enslaved by Alfred Morris, who came to Missouri from Kentucky in 1322 and began buying land in Howard County, eventually owning about 1,600 to 1,700 acres.

Also on the property is a contributing slave cabin of wood-frame construction.

It was listed on the National Register of Historic Places in 1969.

References

Houses on the National Register of Historic Places in Missouri
Federal architecture in Missouri
Houses completed in 1830
Buildings and structures in Howard County, Missouri
National Register of Historic Places in Howard County, Missouri
Slave cabins and quarters in the United States
History of slavery in Missouri